Grand-Santi is a commune of French Guiana, an overseas region and department of France located in South America. Most of the inhabitants are Ndyuka Maroons and Surinamese immigrants.

History 
The commune was originally called Grand-Santi-Papaichton and included the now independent communes of Apatou and Papaichton. On 12 November 1976 Apatou was detached from Grand-Santi-Papaichton and became an independent commune. On 1 January 1993 Papaichton was also detached from Grand-Saint-Papaichton and became an independent commune. On that occasion, the name of the commune was shortened into Grand-Santi. The commune mainly lives from small-scale agriculture and fishing. The commune also contains other villages like .

Population

Transport 

The commune can only be reached by boat or airplane.

See also
Communes of French Guiana

References

External links
 Official site (in French)

Communes of French Guiana